The Landtag of Thuringia is the parliament of the German federal state of Thuringia. It convenes in Erfurt and currently consists of 90 members from six parties. According to the free state's constitution, the primary functions of the Landtag are to pass laws, elect the Minister-President and control the government of Thuringia.

Elections

Elections are held every five years using the German Mixed-member proportional representation (MMP) system, with an election threshold of 5% vote share to receive any seats. All German citizens 18 years of age or older living in Thuringia are entitled to vote. If a party wins more constituency seats than its overall share of the vote, the overall size of the Landtag increases because of these overhang and leveling mandates.

Current composition

As of the elections of 27 October 2019, The Left is the largest party.

Historical Composition

History

The Landtag of the newly established Free State of Thuringia (Freistaat Thüringen) first convened in 1920 in Weimar. Its deputies were elected for three years according to a proportional representation system, with a minimum voting age of 21. During the Weimar Republic period until 1933, six state elections were held. Upon the 1929 elections, Thuringia became one of the first German federal states where the Nazi Party gained real political power. Wilhelm Frick was appointed Minister of the Interior for the state of Thuringia after the NSDAP won six delegates to the Landtag. In the 1932 elections the Nazis emerged as the strongest party with 26 of 61 seats and Fritz Sauckel assumed the office of Minister-President. Following the Nazi seizure of power in Berlin, the Landtag was abolished in the Gleichschaltung process by the "Law on the Reconstruction of the Reich" of 30 January 1934.

After World War II, the State of Thuringia was re-established as part of the Soviet occupation zone. On 13 June 1946 the Soviet Military Administration summoned a state assembly (Landesversammlung) chaired by Ricarda Huch; the first post-war Landtag elections were held on 20 October 1946 and the constituent meeting took place on November 21 at the Elephant hotel in Weimar. By the time of the Constitution of East Germany in 1949, the Landtags were largely deprived of power and the second state elections on 15 October 1950 were already held under the terms of the National Front unity list. In 1952, the East German government dissolved the federal states and Thuringia was divided into districts centered in Erfurt, Gera and Suhl.

The State of Thuringia was restored during Germany's reunification and Landtag elections were again held on 14 October 1990.

Notes

See also
List of presidents of the Landtag of Thuringia
2004 Thuringia state election
2009 Thuringia state election
2014 Thuringian state election
2019 Thuringian state election

References

External links

Thuringia
Politics of Thuringia
Buildings and structures in Erfurt